A crab is a type of scratch used by turntablists.  It is made from a combination of moving the record on the turntable by hand and quick movement of the crossfader.

Creation 
The crab scratch was invented by DJ Qbert while in Japan. Qbert then took the idea back to San Francisco and after showing the scratch to DJ Disk, he created a move that used 3 or 4 fingers: the crab. Later in 1995, while the DMC USA finals were being held in San Francisco, a group of DJs and judges which included The Beat Junkies, The X-Men (now called the X-ecutioners), and the rest of ISP among others got together for what would later be known as the "Famous Warehouse Session" at Yoga Frog's old mobile DJ warehouse. It was at this session that Qbert publicized the new scratch.

While the name "crab" seems self-explanatory since it makes your hand look like a crab when you curl all of your fingers to perform it, according to Qbert the name originated elsewhere. Apparently, he and Mixmaster Mike had just returned from Beirut, Lebanon around the same time that he invented it where they were served crepes one night after a show. He said that when the people over there pronounced crepes, it sounded more like "cccccreb" and since he thought it was funny, he used it to name the "cccccreb" scratch which everyone now pronounces as the crab.

Technique 
To do a crab scratch the DJ quickly rubs/taps the fader knob with 3 or 4 different fingers in sequence starting with the pinkie or ring finger while using the thumb as a spring to cut the fader back out after each tap (or in if scratching hamster style). The result is much like a 3 or 4 tap transform (or a 3 or 4 click flare if you scratch hamster style) only much quicker than you could probably do with one finger. Many DJs find this move easier or more comfortable to perform hamster style by bouncing the fader off the side of the fader slot, but the move can be performed both normal and hamster. As with orbits, crabs can be performed once as a single distinct move, or sequenced to produce a cyclical never ending type of crab sound.

Musical techniques
DJing